Crown & Clown is the tenth studio album by Taiwanese Mandopop artist Will Pan. It was released by Universal Music Taiwan on 13 June 2014. The album features eleven tracks mainly written and co-produced by Pan. Other contributors include his frequent collaborator Jeremy Ji, Bi Daniel, Luke Tsui and Terry Tye Lee, among others. The album also features a duet, "打呼" (Snore), with Rainie Yang, which is also the opening theme song of Taiwanese television series Tie The Knot (媽咪的男朋友).

A deluxe edition was released on 8 August 2014 with a bonus DVD containing six music videos, a dance music video of the track "小丑" (Crown), and 30 minutes of bonus footage.

Track listing

 Notes
 "打呼 (Snore)" is the opening theme song of Taiwanese television series Tie The Knot (媽咪的男朋友).

Music videos

Charts

Album chart

References

External links 
 AllMusic - Crown & Clown 
 Universal Music Taiwan - 王者丑生 
 Will Pan Official website 

2014 albums
Will Pan albums
Universal Music Taiwan albums